Ahmed Yassin (1937-2004), was a Palestinian imam and politician

Ahmed Yassin may also refer to:

Ahmed Yusuf Yasin (born 1957), Somaliland politician and lawyer
Ahmed Yasin (footballer) (born 1991), Iraqi football winger
Ahmed Yassin (footballer) (born 1997), Egyptian football centre-back